Tomi Källarsson (born March 15, 1979) is a Finnish former professional ice hockey defenceman.  He played in the SM-liiga for HPK, Ilves, Blues and JYP and also played in the Swedish Elitserien for Timrå IK. He was drafted 93rd overall by the New York Rangers in the 1997 NHL Entry Draft.

Career statistics

External links

1979 births
Living people
Espoo Blues players
Finnish ice hockey defencemen
HC Milano players
HC Salamat players
Herning Blue Fox players
HPK players
Ilves players
JYP Jyväskylä players
New York Rangers draft picks
Lahti Pelicans players
Timrå IK players